Bravissimo is a lingerie retailer that provides lingerie in D-L cup sizes and swimwear in a D-K cup range. It has 26 stores across the UK 1 store in the US and also sell via mail order, online and via a US website. They are based in Leamington Spa, Warwickshire, and currently employ over 400 people.

History

Founder Sarah Tremellen MBE began as a freelance TV and radio researcher for the BBC before quitting eight months later aged 25 to have a baby. Whilst pregnant, Tremellen found it difficult to find a good choice of bras that would fit her when she went up to a G Cup.

In 1995 after giving birth, Tremellen and her friend Hannah Griffiths tried to do something about it. They decided to take an eight-week business course which culminated in presenting a business plan to their local bank manager. Their presentation won them a £10,000 bank loan to help them start Bravissimo.

Working in Tremellen's living room of her Twickenham flat, they made a catalogue to sell by mail order with all the best bras they could find and started a mailing list of around 75 people—mostly friends and family. Tremellen then telephoned several women's magazines and newspapers, and within a month got coverage in the Daily Mail bringing in 1,000 requests for a catalogue.

In 1996 they were able to move out of Tremellen's Twickenham flat and 12 months later Tremellen and her husband Mike bought Hannah Griffiths out of the business. In November 1999, Bravissimo opened its first shop in Ealing which is one of the 16 stores nationwide they currently operate. The next year Mike Tremellen left his job at Tetley to become the business operations director.

In 2001 Bravissimo relocated to their current headquarters in Leamington Spa.

In 2017, Bravissimo launched its US website and began looking for its first US shop site. In the same year their sales grew by 2% to £50.2 million, but pre-tax profit decreased to £2.2 million from £3.3 million a year earlier, partly owing to spending on new shops.

Bravissimo sold a clothing range for a number of years, at one point branding this as "Pepperberry", but the clothing range was discontinued in 2021.

Management 
In December 2020, Leanne Cahill, the managing director of Bravissimo, has been elevated to chief executive.

Awards

Bravissimo has been in the Sunday Times "100 Best Companies to work for" list for since 2007, when they came 19th; in 2018 they were awarded 13th place. The list rates a company's performance on 8 key factors which takes into account things such as pay, leadership, social impact and personal growth. They were awarded 99th, 26th, 24th and 8th place respectively between 2008 - 2011.
In 2011 Bravissimo was nominated for the Multiple Retailer of the Year award at the UK Lingerie Awards

Sarah Tremellen was awarded an MBE in 2009 in the New Year’s Honours List for services to entrepreneurship.
In 2017, Bravissimo won 'best multi-product E-tailer' at the Underlines Stars Awards  At the UK Lingerie Awards in 2018, Bravissimo won "Customer Service Provider of the Year", and Sarah Tremellen won the UKLA Lifetime Achievement Award.

References

External links
 

British companies established in 1995
Clothing companies established in 1995
Retail companies established in 1995
Lingerie brands
Clothing retailers of England
Clothing companies of England